133 Squadron may refer to:

 No. 133 Squadron RCAF, see list of Royal Canadian Air Force squadrons
 133 Squadron (Israel)
 No. 133 Squadron RAF, United Kingdom
 133d Aero Squadron, Air Service, United States Army; see list of American aero squadrons
 133d Air Refueling Squadron, United States Air Force
 VAQ-133, United States Navy
 VF-133, United States Navy
 VP-133, United States Navy
 VMA-133, United States Marine Corps